Samurai from Outer Space: Understanding Japanese Animation is a 1998 book written by Antonia Levi. The book was published in North America by Open Court Publishing Company on December 30, 1998.

Reception
Anime News Network's Mikhail Koulikov commends the book for its "accessible introduction to looking at anime from an academic perspective" but criticises it for being "limited in scope, sloppy in execution, and badly dated". Animation World Magazine's Fred Patten commends the book for "breaking new ground" by delivering "the first detailed discussion of the popular-culture   sociology of anime." However, he criticises the book for mis-dating, "a couple of minor   titles are consistently misspelled" and "the color plates are beautiful but   notably pixillated [sic], as though printed from enlarged color faxes or "video   screen captures" rather than from clear film transparencies."

References

1998 non-fiction books
Books about manga